Emiliya Khalsberiyevna Turey (born 6 October 1984 in Astrakhan)  is a Russian handballer who plays as a left wing. She is a three-time World Champion (2005, 2007 & 2009), silver medalist of the 2008 Summer Olympics in Beijing and the 2006 European Championship, and bronze medalist of the 2008 European Championship, all with the National Team of Russia. She also won the EHF Champions League in 2007 and the EHF Cup Winners' Cup in 2009 as a club player. Turey is of Sierra Leonean descent through her father.

She competed at the 2011 World Women's Handball Championship in Brazil, where the Russian team placed 6th.

International honours
EHF Champions League:
Winner: 2007 
Finalist: 2011
EHF Cup Winners' Cup:
Winner: 2009
World Championship:
Gold Medalist: 2005, 2007, 2009
European Championship:
Silver Medalist: 2006
Bronze Medalist: 2008
Olympic Games:
Silver Medalist: 2008

Individual awards
All-Star Left Wing of the World Championship: 2011

References

External links

Russian female handball players
Handball players at the 2008 Summer Olympics
Handball players at the 2012 Summer Olympics
Olympic handball players of Russia
Olympic silver medalists for Russia
Russian people of Sierra Leonean descent
Sportspeople from Astrakhan
Living people
1984 births
Olympic medalists in handball
Medalists at the 2008 Summer Olympics
Expatriate handball players
Russian expatriate sportspeople in Denmark
Russian expatriate sportspeople in Spain
Russian expatriate sportspeople in Romania